The Iriomote cat (Prionailurus bengalensis iriomotensis) is a subspecies of the leopard cat that lives exclusively on the Japanese island of Iriomote. It has been listed as critically endangered on the IUCN Red List since 2008, as the only population comprises fewer than 250 adult individuals and is considered declining. As of 2007, there were an estimated 100–109 individuals remaining.

In Japanese, it is called .

Description

The fur of the Iriomote cat is mostly dark gray and light brown, with lighter hair on the belly and insides of the limbs. Hair along the jaw is white. There are two dark brown spots on each cheek. There are 5–7 stripes spanning from the forehead to the back of the head, but, unlike the leopard cat, the stripes stop before reaching the shoulders. Dark brown spots cover the sides of the body, and there are 3–4 bands of irregular stripes on the chest. The tail is dark brown; darker spots pattern the back side of the tail while the underside of the tail is solid. The tip of the tail is dark.

The tips of the ears are rounded, with black hair along the edge. There are no tufts of longer hair on the top of the ears. Adult Iriomote cats have a white spot on the back of each ear, much like those found on tigers' ears. Young Iriomote cats do not have these marks, and even as adults the spots will not be as white as those seen on other leopard cat subspecies.

The Iriomote cat's eyes are a light amber color. Its nose is large and flat, with no fur covering the reddish-brown skin.

The skull is longer and more narrow than that of a domestic cat. When compared to the leopard cat's skull, the Iriomote cat's is roughly the same size but thicker. Because of this, the Iriomote cat's brain is smaller; a male leopard cat's brain is about 42 grams, whereas a male Iriomote cat's brain is about 30 grams. The occipital bone of the skull and the auditory capsule are not connected. The mandibular symphysis is short.

It has a long body and short, thick limbs. Its neck is also thick, and its shoulders are muscular, though its jumping power is comparatively weak.

The Iriomote cat has six pairs of incisors, two pairs of canine teeth, four pairs of premolars, and two pairs of molars for a total of 28 teeth. Compared to other cats, including small wild cats, the Iriomote cat is lacking one pair of premolars on the top jaw behind the canines. In addition to this, unlike most other subtropical mammals, Iriomote cats' teeth give details about their year-to-year history. It is expected that these details will help determine the age and behavior of the cats.

The anal glands of the Iriomote cat surround the anus; this contrasts with other cat species', where they are inside the anus.

Distribution

Iriomote consists predominantly of low mountains ranging  in elevation with subtropical evergreen forest, including extensive belts of mangrove along the waterways. It is the smallest habitat of any wild cat species in the world.

It prefers areas near rivers, forest edges, and places with low humidity.

Ecology and behavior
Iriomote cats are terrestrial, but climb trees, go into the water and also swim. They are nocturnal and especially active during twilight hours. During the daytime, they sleep in tree hollows or in caves. They mark their territory by urinating and defecating on rocks, tree stumps and bushes.

Home range
Iriomote cats are usually solitary. Their home range varies seasonally and also individually, and is smaller during the mating season. In 1998 and 1999, a male and a female Iriomote cat were radio tracked for seven to 13 successive days in the western part of the island. Their home ranges overlapped extensively in all periods.

Iriomote cats are territorial. Home ranges of males and females overlap, and one to two females live within a male's home range. Typically, home ranges of same gender cats will not overlap, but partial overlaps are seen. Often, these small overlaps are hunting grounds. It is thought that they patrol their territories during three to four days, marking and hunting as they go.

Young male Iriomote cats and some adult cats are transient, i. e. wandering over the island and waiting for an open home range slot that they can occupy by marking this area. Female cats allow their young to stay in their own home range and mark a new territory once the next breeding season comes.

Feeding ecology

Iriomote cats are carnivorous and prey on various mammals, birds, reptiles, amphibians, fish, and crustaceans. They typically ingest  of food a day. Other wild cats primarily hunt small mammals, such as rodents and rabbits, but because there are no other carnivores to compete with the Iriomote cat on the island, there is no need for them to isolate themselves from the various habitats and food sources that are available. Thus, their diet is quite varied.

Mammalian prey includes black rats, Ryukyu flying foxes and young Ryukyu wild boar. Their prey also includes a wide range of birds, such as the Eastern spot-billed duck, slaty-legged crake, Eurasian scops-owl, pale thrush, and white-breasted waterhen.
Reptiles include various types of snakes and Kishinoue's giant skink. They are also known to hunt Sakishima rice frogs, yellow-spotted crickets and crabs. As their hunting grounds tend to be in swamps or on shores, they sometimes swim and dive to catch water birds, fish, and freshwater prawns.

When eating birds that are larger than a dusky thrush, most types of cats will pluck the feathers and then eat it, but the Iriomote cat will eat even large birds whole without removing the feathers. Also, unlike other cats, the Iriomote cat does not kill its prey immediately by breaking the spinal cord. Instead, it holds the animal in its mouth until it stops moving.

It is estimated that water birds comprise about 60% of the cat's diet with black rats being its secondary source of food at about 10–30% of its diet. Based on stool samples, birds represent 60% of their diet, black rats 30%, insects 30%, lizards and frogs about 15–20%, bats 3–17%, and wild pig less than 1%. In addition, fish and crustaceans appear roughly 3–4% of the time.

Seasonal dietary changes have been observed. They eat rats and frogs year-round, lizards in the summer and spring, and crickets and bats more often in the fall and winter.

Reproductive behavior
During the mating season, Iriomote cats become active during the day as well. Breeding females are more active than nonbreeding ones during the late night and morning hours. Outside the mating season the cats live in solitary, but when they begin breeding they act together. The mating season lasts from December to March, and females go into heat several times during this period, with the peak being in January and February. Towards the end of February, they fast for about two weeks. It is during this period that females are most sexually excited. Male and female cats always stay together at this time, and it is thought that conception happens during these two weeks.

Pregnancy is viviparous, and between April and June pregnant female cats give birth to 1–3 kittens in a tree hollow or cavern. The locations chosen for birthing and rearing are dry and have good ventilation. Kittens stay with their mother for about eleven months. They begin to become more independent during the fall and winter months. They stay in their mother's home range from anywhere between a few months and years. Kittens reach maturity twenty months after birth.

Lifespan
It is estimated that Iriomote cats live for seven to eight years in the wild, and eight to nine years in captivity. Human influences, traffic accidents and traps may lower their lifespan to two to five years. In captivity, an Iriomote cat lived for an estimated 15 years and one month, the longest known lifespan of any Iriomote cat.

Discovery
In 1967, it was first described by Yoshinori Imaizumi, director of the zoological department of the National Museum of Nature and Science in Tokyo.

Prior to its scientific discovery, the Iriomote cat was known locally by various names: , . Others, however, believed that the Iriomote cat was a feral cat.

Prior to specimen acquisition
Based on information from local people,  from the University of the Ryukyus was able to capture a kitten in 1962, but did not get an adult specimen. In 1964,  from the exploration department of Waseda University informed Imaizumi of the rumors of a cat living in the mountains of Iriomote.

In February 1965, Togawa visited the Yaeyama Islands. He had heard in Naha from a newspaper columnist that there were rumors of wild cats living on Iriomote. He at first assumed that, like reports of the extinct Japanese wolf, people must have been mistaking escaped and feral house pets for wild animals. He spoke with colleague Tetsuo Koura who knew of and believed there to be some truth to the rumors. Koura then entrusted Togawa with the task of acquiring evidence. Togawa then traveled to Iriomote to gather information for his own report and to collect information on the Iriomote cat and a specimen.

Upon arriving on the island, Togawa learned that because there wasn't enough food on Iriomote, people would cook Iriomote cats that had been caught and use the meat in soup. Cats caught in traps would also be disposed of, which made acquiring samples difficult.

There, a middle school teacher who had worked under Koura said that he had caught one of the cats in a trap set for wild boar. He had sent the skin to Koura but buried the rest of the body. Togawa dug up the remains and got the skull.

He returned to Koura and sent the two skins, the feces, and the skull to Yoshinori Imaizumi at the National Museum of Nature and Science where  examined the remains. The analysis was performed on 14 March 1965. The results showed the cat to be either a new species or a new subspecies, but there weren't enough samples to confirm. They requested either a complete set of remains or a live specimen. Following the announcement, some members of the society believed the samples to show simple mutations while others believed them to be the remains of wild cats that had previously been brought to and left on the island by foreign ships.

Live specimen acquisition to announcement
In June 1965, Togawa returned to Iriomote with Koura in order to obtain a complete set of remains, a live specimen, and information regarding the cat's ecology. They brought box traps and silvervine to aid their efforts in catching a live cat. According to hunters, though, only one or two cats per year were caught, and the number of remaining cats was probably quite low. Togawa did not expect to catch one alive.

The teacher in charge of the children took the cat. Another teacher preserved the pelt in formalin and buried the skeleton in a wooden box behind the school. Togawa exhumed the remains, and this cat became the prototype for the species. In addition to this example, the scientists also were able to obtain the crushed skull of a kitten from the neighboring Yubu Island that was later reconstructed by Imaizumi.

In addition to researching the Iriomote cat, Togawa also looked into rumors of a larger cat on the island (see #Yamapikaryaa) and conducted an investigation. Before returning to Tokyo, he offered $100 for any live Iriomote cat and $30 for dead cats that were brought to him. He also announced rewards for the rumored large cat on the island: $200 if brought in alive, $100 for remains.

Through these offers, he acquired two complete skeletons, two skulls, and three pelts that he brought back with him to Tokyo. One of the pelts was that which the elementary school children helped obtain, and it was confirmed to be that of an Iriomote cat. The sample from Yubu Island was small, and judgment was held back. A sample from Ishigaki Island was discovered to be a house cat.

In January 1966, the body of an Iriomote cat that had been caught in a wild boar trap in the mid-basin of the Nakama River was sent to Koura at the University of the Ryukyus, but there was no more information regarding captures for some time after this. In December 1966, a hunter at the Nakama River's mid-basin, caught a live male cat, but it escaped immediately. He then caught another male cat soon after.

On January 15, 1966, local hunters caught a young female Iriomote cat near . The National Museum of Nature and Science planned on using funds intended for garden repairs to pay for the specimens, but the hunters who caught the cats expected $1000–$3000 per cat. At the persuasion of the director of the District Forestry Office, the hunters accepted an award within the budget as a “daily allowance” or “finder's fee”.

He traveled to Naha for these discussions, which covered the possibility of offering the two captured Iriomote cats to the emperor with the stated purpose of increasing national knowledge about Iriomote and for the promotion of industrial development on the island. At the same time, the Taketomi town offices, under the premise of obtaining permission from the Ryukyu government to keep the cats, confiscated samples from the staff of the National Museum of Nature and Science and brought them back to their offices.

With Togawa pressuring the newspapers and Yoshinori Imaizumi urging the Ryukyuan government and Southern Japan Liaison Offices through the Ministry of Education, the Southern Japan Liaison Offices denied the possibility of giving the cats to the emperor, and the Ryukyuan government persuaded the mayor not to follow through with his plans. Finally, the specimens were delivered to the museum.

The cats arrived at Haneda airport in March 1967. Yoshinori Imaizumi kept them shortly until Togawa, having been entrusted by the museum to observe them, took charge of them for about two years. The cats were then transferred to the museum for monitoring. The male died on April 25, 1973 and the female on December 13, 1975. The male's pelt was temporarily stuffed, the blood was sent off for chromosomal research, and the rest of the body was preserved in formaldehyde. The female was stuffed and put on display in the museum.

In May 1967, The Mammalogical Society of Japan issued their third and fourth issues, announcing in English the discovery of a new genus of cat that was closely related to the primitive cat genus Metailurus. The former genus name of Mayailurus stems from the word used for “cat” on Iriomote, maya-, while -ailurus comes ancient Greek and also means “cat”. The subspecies name of iriomotensis means “from Iriomote”. Koura agreed with Togawa, thus officiating the name.

Classification and genealogy
Imaizumi pointed out that, compared to other leopard cats, the Iriomote cat retained some especially primitive features. Judging from these characteristics, he estimated that the Iriomote cat evolved as a species sometime between ten million years ago in the Miocene epoch and three million years ago during the Pliocene epoch. He also thought that they shared many primitive characteristics with fossils of the extinct genus Metailurus. He emphasized these points, stating that the Iriomote cat and Metailurus shared a common ancestor sometime between ten million and five million years ago, and from that he deducted that the Iriomote cat's ancestors must have widened its range from mainland Asia to Iriomote and other areas beginning three million years ago. It appears to be a very ancient species, a ‘missing link’, nearer to the common root of the cat tribe than any other extant species.

In contrast to Imaizumi's assertions about its unique characteristics, other researchers strongly disputed the idea that the Iriomote cat is its own species ever since its discovery. Investigations involving skulls and teeth, samples and living animals, and genetic research were conducted. Because of these study results, it was subordinated under the genus Prionailurus as Prionailurus iriomotensis in 2005.

The Iriomote cat's karyotype, the restriction fragment length of the ribosomal RNA (rRNA), and molecular phylogenetic analyses of the mitochondrial 12S rRNA and cytochrome b have proven to be identical, or nearly so, to the leopard cat's. The two cats are assumed to be extremely closely related, their differences being categorized as either intraspecies variations or individual mutations. Also, from the speed of cytochrome b's base-pair substitution and its diversity, it is estimated that the Iriomote cat diverged from the leopard cat around 180,000-200,000 years ago. According to marine geologists, the Ryukyu Islands were connected to mainland Asia via a land bridge from about 20,000 years ago to 240,000 years ago. Scientists believe that the Iriomote cat moved its range to the islands during this period. Because of this, it is assumed that there is little genetic variety within the species.

Threats

Destruction of habitat due to development, predation by dogs, traffic accidents, and traps set for wild boar and crabs all contribute to the decline in number of Iriomote cats. During the second survey of the island, conducted from 1982–1984, it was estimated that 83–108 Iriomote cats lived on the island. The third survey, conducted from 1993–1994, estimated that 99–110 of the cats were on the island. During the fourth survey, conducted from 2005–2007, there were an estimated 100–109 remaining cats. The method of estimating the numbers differed between the third and fourth surveys, though; if the third estimate were to be revised, there would have been an estimated 108–118 Iriomote cats at the time, meaning that the population is shrinking over time.

Along with the traffic accidents, logging due to development, and development of the swamplands, house pets are also causing problems. House cats and stray cats especially cause issues with competition, disease transmission, and genetic pollution due to hybrids born of inter-species breeding. It is also feared that dogs prey on the Iriomote cats.

The primary fear stems from house cats that have become feral or partially feral, but there has been no monitoring of these interactions. Pressure from competition over food, contact with house cats that have contracted feline immunodeficiency virus (FIV) and other contagious diseases, as well as decrease in population due to hybridization are all important issues with the Iriomote cat.

In June 1999, the Iriomote Wildlife Protection Center conducted an investigation among 50 house and feral cats and 23 Iriomote cats in order to see if FIV was being transmitted within the populations. FIV was not seen in any of the Iriomote cats, but three of the house and feral cats tested positive. Because of the fears regarding transmission of the disease, starting in 2001 Taketomi Town enacted the Cat Breeding Ordinance which required all residents to register their pet cats. In June 2008, the ordinance was revised to include mandatory FIV testing and vaccinations, spaying and neutering, and microchipping. A new limit to the number of pets allowed per owner was also added.

Furthermore, the cane toad, which secretes a poisonous liquid from glands in its ears, has also appeared on the island. In order to prevent further contamination of Iriomote, residents of Ishigaki Island began extermination measures in 2008.

Conservation

Status
Since 2008, the Iriomote cat is categorized as "critically endangered" by IUCN.

The Iriomote cat has been designated a natural monument by the Okinawa government. On May 15, 1972, along with the recovery of Okinawa, it was nationally recognized as a natural monument. This act was adopted on January 28 and enacted on March 1.

Projects and activities
In 1977, Prince Philip, Duke of Edinburgh wrote a letter addressed to Crown Prince Akihito regarding the preservation of the Iriomote cat. The report attached to the letter (written by Professor Leyhausen) suggested outlawing any further migration to the island as well as banning the cultivation of the land. In response, Crown Prince Akihito said that he wished for a way that would allow for the preservation of the cats and the continued habitation of people on the island. He also explained that the prime minister at the time, Takeo Fukuda, was considering the implementation of a wildlife sanctuary on Iriomote.

In 1972, the National Museum of Nature and Science prepared for researching the ecology of Iriomote cats, and in November 1973 the World Wide Fund for Nature and the Ministry of the Environment conducted a joint preliminary investigation regarding the cat's ecology, and from 1974 the Ministry of the Environment conducted a comprehensive investigation that lasted three years. After that, there were three more investigations beginning in 1982, 1992, and 2005.

In 1979, the EPA began a three-year-long feeding operation in order to increase the survival rate of kittens, but these actions have received some criticism.

Since the Iriomote cat's discovery, various investigations have taken place. In 2006, automatic cameras and radio telemetry were used in order to understand the cats' state of life. Pathological tests regarding the contagiousness of diseases were also conducted, and tests on feces and food leftovers were also done. They also compiled records of cat sightings by locals and tourists.

Despite these efforts, not enough land within the cats' preferred habitat of less than 200 meters above sea level was included.

Since the US returned control of the Ryukyu Islands to Japan in 1972, development on Iriomote continued with finances from the Okinawan mainland. In 1977, a prefectural road was built that circles half of the island, which has led to a few Iriomote cat deaths every year due to traffic accidents. The Ministry of the Environment as well as the governments of Okinawa and Taketomi Town began installing road signs to warn people of Iriomote cats crossing the road, tunnels beneath the road for their safe crossing, zebra zones which create loud noises when cars ride over them, wide ditches on the sides of roads, and ditches on the side of the road that are inclined on one side in order to improve the preservation of the cats. However, many residents have objected to restrictions on land cultivation and improvement brought about by the measures in place to protect the Iriomote cat and other species on the island.

In captivity
There have been a handful of Iriomote cats kept in captivity. A five-week-old male kitten that had been separated from its mother was found on June 14, 1979. He was named Keita and was kept at the Okinawa Zoo until he died of old age at approximately thirteen years and two months of age. A female specimen was also kept at the National Museum of Nature and Science. She was believed to have been approximately nine years and seven months old when she died. On August 6, 1996, a male kitten that would later be known as Yon was taken into care at the Iriomote Wildlife Protection Center after being involved in a traffic accident.

Yon

Discovery and hospitalization

On August 6, 1996, a young Iriomote cat was involved in a traffic accident near Nadara Bridge on the northern part of the island. He weighed 1.6 kilograms and was assumed to have been born in early March, making him about five months old. It is possible that he had just been separated from his mother. The next morning he had regained consciousness, but he wasn't able to regulate his body temperature due to the serious injuries he received. He was transferred to Ishigaki Island at 9 am to receive medical care at Ishigaki Veterinary Clinic. He spent 24 days under their care.

Following the accident he couldn't move on his own, but he regained his ability to walk while on Ishigaki. He was brought back to the Iriomote Wildlife Preservation Center for rehabilitation on August 31. Originally labeled W-48 due to the fact that he was the forty-eighth confirmed sighting of an Iriomote cat on the western part of the island, he eventually was given the name Yon.

Rehabilitation
By September 2, Yon weighed 1.9 kilograms. Despite his progress, his caretakers noticed a tendency for him to turn to the right because of the effects of his accident.

From the beginning, Yon's caretakers took careful measures in order to avoid acclimation to humans so that one day he could be released back into the wild. Only three staff members were allowed to feed him directly. Other people, including center staff, were only allowed to view him via video camera monitoring. The media were also prohibited from taking direct photographs.

From the time he was discharged until February 3, 1999 Yon's rehabilitation was restricted to a room within the center. Thin logs were used to make a jungle gym so that he would be able to practice walking, jumping, and climbing trees. Rice plants were also grown in his room as a substitute for grass that cats use to help regurgitate. Once he was healthy enough, he was moved to an outdoor cage where he lived until his health began deteriorating on December 20, 2010.

Death
On December 20, 2010 Yon was found to be curled up and unmoving near a dried stream. He was brought into the center's rehabilitation room, where it was discovered that he had pulmonary edema, which had nearly killed him; however, he was able to eat by the next day and gradually got better. He was unable to walk for the remainder of December, though by the end of January he had regained this ability and, during February and March, he improved enough to be able to walk up and down stairs. However, his condition then took a turn for the worse, and he died on the night of April 9 at an estimated fifteen years and one month old. He weighed 3.5 kilograms and was 78.5 centimeters long. He is the oldest Iriomote cat on record.

Influence on research
Yon was the first Iriomote cat to be kept for an extended period of time, the only to be saved after an accident, and the first to go through rehabilitation. Other Iriomote cats that were rescued either died immediately or shortly after being brought in for care.

Though he was never returned to the wild, the recorded observations of Yon are extremely important regarding Iriomote cat preservation. Every day, records were taken including what he did at what time, weight, and anything else of note. Because of difficulties in researching Iriomote cats in the wild, observations of Yon are currently the best example of the cats' natural behavior. There are also very few cases of the cats being cared for by people, so records of his health care may help injured and sick Iriomote cats in the future.

In culture
 

In July 2010, the Taketomi Tourist Association invited residents to create a design for a local mascot. A Komi Elementary School sixth grader's design, which was based on the Iriomote cat, was chosen. The island of Iriomote is pictured on the mascot's chest. It was named in the same manner it was designed; in August 2010, the name  was chosen based on the submission of an Ishigaki resident who drew inspiration from the local nickname of the cat, yamapikaryaa.
The town of Taketomi initiated an "Iriomote Wild Cat Day" in 2015. In July 2016, Taketomi signed a partnership with Tsushima based on their common endemic wild cats. Tsushima hosts the Tsushima cat, another leopard cat subspecies.
The island also has several statues representing the Iriomote cat. In the south-east of the island, spanning across the Nakama River, the Nakama bridge is guarded on each side by two stone statues of the cat in various positions. And in 2017, the town of Taketomi revealed two new bronze statues, one in a rest area on the west coast of the Iriomote island, and the other at the beginning of a bridge in the North of the island.

The comedy manga series Azumanga Daioh and subsequent animated adaptation by Kiyohiko Azuma features an Iriomote kitten named Mayaa. As their class go on a school trip in Okinawa, the main characters decide to visit the Iriomote island where Sakaki bonds with Mayaa, and ends up raising it.
In the manga series Tokyo Mew Mew by Reiko Yoshida and Mia Ikumi, the main characters get accidentally infused with the DNA of endangered species, giving them super powers. The heroine Ichigo Momomiya thus gets infused with the DNA of the Iriomote cat, allowing her to transform into a catgirl.

Yamapikaryaa
In general, names such as yamapikaryaa are used in reference to the Iriomote cat, but some locals claim to have seen another type of cat on the island. This cat is described as being twice as large as a house cat with a tail that is 60 centimeters long and a coat pattern that is different from what the Iriomote cat displays. It has been sighted several times. Locals have given it several nicknames. It is not thought to be a house cat, stray cat, or an Iriomote cat.

In 1965, Togawa spoke with a local hunter who claimed to have killed a large cat with fur like a tiger's. He disposed of the body, and Haemi on the southern part of the island, where the body was disposed of, was searched. The hunter said that, until ten days prior to the interview, the cat's skeleton was still where he had left it, but the recent rains had washed it away. He described that cat as having a shoulder height that reached an adult human's knee, a tail that was 60 centimeters long, a body twice as large as a house cat's, and greenish striped fur.

On June 2, 1982 the Yomiuri Shimbun published an article about yamapikaryaa. An experienced boar hunter claimed to have seen yamapikaryaa about ten times in the mountains around Mount Dedou. He also said that he caught and ate one once. On another occasion, he said he saw an adult female yamapikaryaa with a kitten.

Other articles regarding yamapikaryaa have also been published, including on September 14, 2007. Professor  of Shimane University, who was staying on Iriomote in order to research fish, spotted a cat larger than the Iriomote cat with a long tail and spots.

, on the other hand, spoke with a hunter in 1994 who had the skull of what he believed was a large wild cat. Tadaaki Imaizumi determined that it was a house cat.

References

Further reading

External links

 BBC 2008: Iriomote cat
 New York Times: As a Japanese Island Grows Less Remote, a Wildcat Grows More Endangered, February 2008
 National Geographic : Rare Japanese Wildcat Edging Closer to Extinction, August 2007
 Wildlife Conservation Center website

Prionailurus
Endemic fauna of the Ryukyu Islands
Endemic mammals of Japan
Mammals described in 1967
Critically endangered fauna of Asia
Subspecies